Caroline O'Connor may refer to:

 Caroline O'Connor (actress) (born 1962), English-Australian singer, dancer and actress
 Caroline O'Connor (rowing) (born 1983), British rowing cox